Ricola Ltd./Ricola AG is a Swiss manufacturer of cough drops and breath mints. The head office of Ricola is located in Laufen, Basel-Country.

Business
Ricola listed sales of 307.2 million Swiss francs in 2016 and employs 400 workers. Around 200 independent production companies in the surrounding area service Ricola. In order to obtain enough herbs for the production of its herbal drops, the firm contracts over 100 self-managed farms in the Valais, Emmental, Val Poschiavo and at the southern foot of the Jura Mountains, in central Switzerland, and in Ticino. Ricola is known for its commercials featuring Heidi (Ramona Pringle) depicting mountaineers shouting "Ri-co-la!" and blowing through a large Alphorn. 

A class action suit in February 2019 alleged non-natural ingredients (malic acid, aspartame, citric acid, sorbitol, ascorbic acid, sodium ascorbate) while labels say "Naturally Soothing" or "Naturally Helps Support Immune System". In November 2019 the judge dismissed two claims and let two claims proceed. An earlier class action suit in November 2015 alleged industrially synthesized ingredients were used (ascorbic acid, citric acid, and malic acid) while labels stated "Naturally Soothing".
The suit was withdrawn without explanation in January 2016.

History
Ricola began in 1930 when Emil Wilhelm Richterich and Daniel Ruoss Sr. established Confiseriefabrik Richterich & Co. Laufen after the purchase of a small bakery in Laufen, just outside Basel. Under Richterich, the bakery specialized in confectionery such as "Fünfermocken", a sweet which was similar to caramel. In 1940 Richterich created Ricola's Swiss Herbal Sweet incorporating a blend of 13 herbs. In the 1950s the sweet became appreciated for its ability to be dissolved in boiling water, creating an aromatic herbal tea or tisane, which inspired Richterich to create a Ricola Herbal Tea a few years later.

In 1967, Emil Richterich and his sons Hans Peter and Alfred renamed the company Ricola, an abbreviation of Richterich & Compagnie Laufen. Export began in the 1970s, introducing Ricola's products to foreign markets. At the end of the decade, Ricola moved to a new purpose-built factory in the vicinity of Laufen, where its headquarters are still located.

In 1976, after extensive research on sugar-free confectionery, Ricola launched Switzerland’s first chewable sugarless herbal sweet. Ricola first started to advertise its products on television in the 1980s, an era that saw increased awareness of the need for good dental hygiene, increasing the demand for sugar-free products such as the ones that Ricola offered. In 1988 the company started packaging their products in small boxes.

The company is now managed by Thomas P. Meier as CEO and Felix Richterich as President of the Board. Today, Ricola exports to over 50 countries in Asia, North America and Europe.

Herbs

While the active ingredient in most Ricola products is menthol, an important part of Ricola products is the herb mixture. The following herbs are noted as being part of Ricola's classic blend of 13 herbs:

 Elder (Sambucus nigra)
 Horehound (Marrubium vulgare)
 Mallow (Malva silvestris)
 Peppermint (Mentha × piperita)
 Sage (Salvia officinalis)
 Thyme (Thymus vulgaris)
 Cowslip (Primula veris)
 Burnet (Pimpinella saxifraga)
 Yarrow (Achillea millefolium)
 Marsh mallow (Althaea officinalis)
 Lady's mantle (Alchemilla vulgaris)
 Speedwell, aka veronica (Veronica officinalis)
 Ripwort plantain (Plantago lanceolata)

In the United States, ten herbs make up the herbal mixture, three of which are not in the list above. These are linden flowers (Tilia platyphyllos), wild thyme (Thymus serpyllum) and hyssop (Hyssopus officinalis).

Ricola herb gardens
Ricola has six show gardens in Switzerland. Visitors to the herb gardens can learn about the original herbal blend in their natural environment and learn all about the cultivation and power of herbs. The gardens can be visited as tourist attractions and are located at the following locations:

 Nenzlingen, near the company headquarters
 Trogberg, a mountain in the canton of Solothurn
 Klewenalp above Beckenried
 Kandersteg in the Berner Oberland
 Zermatt in the Valais
 Pontresina in the southern part of Grisons

The herbs used to produce Ricola's cough drops are not cultivated in these gardens, but in natural plantations in the Swiss mountains in accordance with strict organic or BioSuisse guidelines. Ricola ensures that its cultivation areas are not situated near industrial sites or the road networks to avoid contact with harmful pollutants. Over 100 self-managed farms are under contract to Ricola in the Valais, Emmental, Puschlav and the Jura Mountains, in Central Switzerland and Ticino. No pesticides, insecticides or herbicides are used in herb cultivation.

References

External links

 Official website

Throat lozenges
Breath mints
Swiss confectionery
Food and drink companies of Switzerland
Food and drink companies established in 1930
Swiss companies established in 1930
Swiss brands